Morgan Entrekin is the president and publisher of Grove/Atlantic Inc. Books in New York City.  He is one of six owners of the publishing company.

He is from Nashville, Tennessee.

Timeline
Entrekin is a graduate of Montgomery Bell Academy, Stanford University and the Radcliffe Publishing Course.  He began his career at Delacorte Press.  In 1982 he moved to Simon & Schuster.  In 1984, he started his own imprint at Atlantic Monthly Press.  In 1993 he merged this company with Grove Press to create Grove/Atlantic Inc. In 2015, he launched Literary Hub with editor Terry McDonell and publisher Andy Hunter. He was the recipient of the 2017 Maxwell E. Perkins Award for Distinguished Achievement in the Field of Fiction.

References

External links
 www.groveatlantic.com
 

Living people
American publishers (people)
Stanford University alumni
Year of birth missing (living people)